Vandana Gupte is a Marathi stage actress who has also performed television and film roles.

Career
Her most well-known TV role was as the domineering Nilambari Pandey in Zee TV's comedy serial Kareena Kareena.

She was a part of project done by Ashok Hande on Manik Varma named Manik Moti with support by Rani Varma and Bharti Achrekar after Manik Varma's death.

Personal life
Vandana is the daughter of noted classical singer Manik Varma and Shri Amar Varma, and sister of Bharati Achrekar and Rani Varma. She is married to criminal defence lawyer Shirish Gupte.

Filmography

Films
 Baipan Bhaari Deva (2023)
Karkhanisanchi Waari: Ashes on a road trip (2021)
Well Done Baby (2020)
Barayan (2018)
Bucket List (2018)
What's up Lagna (2018)
Photocopy (2015)
Family Katta (2016) - Malati Madhukar Sabnis
Double Seat (2015)
Andhali Koshimbir (2014) Marathi
Time Please (2013) Marathi
Mani Mangalsutra (2010) Marathi
Samaantar (2009) Marathi
The Other End of the Line (2008) Hindi and English
Gharatyasathi Saare Kahi (2008) Marathi
Meerabai Not Out (2008) Hindi
It's Breaking News (2007) Hindi
Matichya Chuli (2006) Marathi
Divasen Divas (2006) Marathi
Pachhadlela (2004) Marathi
Lapandav (1993) Marathi
Pasant Aahe Mulgi (1989)

Television
x Zone (1998) Hindi Zee TV
Kareena Kareena (2004–2005) Hindi Zee TV
Pandey aur Pandey (2006) Hindi Bollywood Songs Countdown Show Zee TV
Hya Gojirvanya Gharaat Marathi ETV Marathi
Bandhan Saat Janamon Ka (2008–2009) Hindi Colors TV
Sajan Re Jhoot Mat Bolo Hindi SAB TV
Aambat Goad Marathi Star Pravah
Sukhanchya Sarini He Man Baware Marathi Colors Marathi

Theatre
Shoo...Kutha Bolaycha Nahi  Marathi
Shree Tashi Sau Marathi
Celebration Marathi
Sundar Mi Honar Marathi
Ramale Mee "Marathi" - Chandralekha
Chaar Chaughi "Marathi" - Shri Chintamani
Ranga Umaltya Manache Marathi - Chandralekha
Padmashree Dhundiraj Marathi
Akhercha Sawaal - with Vijaya Mehta
Madanbaadhaa - Marathi
Sonchapha Marathi - Chandralekha
Gaganbhedi Marathi - Chandralekha
Sundar Mi Honar - Marathi - by P.L. Deshpande
Wada Chirebandi - Marathi
Jhunja - Marathi
Premaa Tujhya Gava Zaave - Marathi - Chandralekha
Saatvya Muleechee Saatvee Mulgee - Marathi
Ani Kahi Olee Paane - Marathi
Char Diwas Premache - Marathi by Ratnakar Matkari
Char Din Pyaar Ke - Hindi by Ratnakar Matkari
Jasma Odhun - Marathi
Sandhyachaya - Marathi

References

External links

Living people
Indian television actresses
Indian stage actresses
Marathi actors
Indian film actresses
Actresses in Marathi cinema
Actresses from Mumbai
Actresses in Marathi theatre
Actresses in Hindi television
21st-century Indian actresses
1952 births